İstiklal (turkish Independence) is a national Turkish daily newspaper published in Istanbul, Turkey. İstiklal is a local newspaper founded in 1974. The publishing center of the newspaper is located in Zeytinburnu district.

References

External links 

 
 
 
 

Newspapers published in Turkey
1974 establishments in Turkey
Zeytinburnu